Estonian partisans, also called the Forest Brothers in Estonia were partisans who engaged in guerrilla warfare against Soviet forces in Estonia from 1940 to 1941 and 1944 to 1978.

When the USSR occupied and annexed Estonia in 1940, former civilians, soldiers, and real and perceived opponents to the Kremlin were threatened with arrest and repression. People began to seek refuge in the forest after the mass deportation on June 14, 1941. 

The largest organization of the Forest Brothers was the Armed Combat Union (RVL), which operated from 1946 to 1949. The most important RVL leaders were killed in the summer of 1949. Large battles between the Forest Brothers and KGB units ended in Estonia in 1953, although minor conflict continued until 1957.

The last Forest Brothers to be arrested were Hugo and Aksel Mõttus, who were captured in Võru County in the summer of 1967. August Sabbe remained at large until 1978, when he was either killed in Võru County by the KGB or drowned attempting to escape them.

History 

The Soviet Union occupied and annexed Estonia, Latvia, and Lithuania in 1940. From then on, former statesmen and soldiers hid in the forests, as they would otherwise have been executed or deported by the new Soviet regime. Many went into hiding after the mass deportation in June 1941.

The Summer War 

When war broke out between Germany and the Soviet Union on June 22, 1941, many armed men went to the forest to help liberate Estonia from Soviet occupation. During the Summer War, the Forest Brothers liberated Southern Estonia. The largest battles took place around Timmkanal, as well as Tartu, where the Forest Brothers started an uprising on July 10, 1941.

After 1944 
By November 25, 1944, the territory of Estonia was completely occupied by the Red Army. By the autumn of that year, thousands of Estonian soldiers, former Wehrmacht officers, and members of the Omakaitse had taken refuge in the forest. Former employees of the Soviet administration and people evading conscription into the Red Army hid alongside them. They were armed mainly with German infantry weapons left behind when the Germans were pushed back. Their uniforms combined elements of the uniforms of the former Estonian army, the Wehrmacht, and civilian clothing.

Until the spring of 1945, the Forest Brothers did not take any noticeable action. The small groups of Forest Brothers consisted of five to ten people, with whom several dozen accomplices in the local population were associated.

The Soviet command and the government of the Estonian SSR concentrated significant forces to fight underground resistance movements. The 5th Infantry Division of the Internal Troops of the NKVD, stationed in Latvia under the command of Major General Pyotr Leontiev, extended its operations to Estonia. Estonian destruction battalions (comprising 5,300 men) were also formed.

Arnold Veimer received a petition from the chairman of the Council of People's Commissars of the Estonian SSR to evict the families of "traitors to the Motherland, traitors, and other hostile elements". In August 1945, 407 civilians, most of them of German descent, were transferred from Estonia to Perm Oblast. 18 families (51 persons) were transferred to Tyumen Oblast in October, 37 families (87 persons) in November, and an additional 37 families (91 persons) in December.

In 1945, NKVD troops and destruction battalions killed 432 Estonian freedom fighters and arrested 584 people, including 449 supporters of the partisans. At the same time, 56 policemen, soldiers, and officers of the NKVD troops; 86 fighter squad members; and 141 pro-Soviet activists were killed. The anti-Soviet partisan war in Estonia continued until 1953. Up to 30,000 people joined the Forest Brothers.

Ants Kaljurand 

One notable Forest Brother was Ants "The Terrible" Kaljurand, who served as the local leader of the RVL, a partisan organization founded by Endel Redlich. Kaljurand was arrested in 1949 and executed in March 1951.

Forest Brothers of Võrumaa 
The Forest Brothers of Võrumaa were sent to destroy large Soviet KGB units, leading to several battles between the KGB forces and the Forest Brothers. Although losses were borne by both sides, most of the battles resulted in greater losses for the Soviet KGB forces.

Substantial battles

Battle of Osula 

The Battle of Osula, or Battle of Määritsa, took place in the village of Osula in Sõmerpalu Parish on 1 April 1946. The battle between the Forest Brothers and the Soviet KGB forces on Meretsi Farm was one of the largest in the county. Seven Forest Brothers, five men and two women, took part in the battle. The exact number of KGB soldiers was unknown. The battle lasted seven hours; near the end of it, the partisans ran out of ammunition and the house caught fire. Two Forest Brothers died during the battle and the rest burned to death inside the house.

A letter was found in the flue of the house's furnace with the text:

Battle of Saika 

The biggest and bloodiest battle between the Forest Brothers was the Battle of Saika in the forest of Saika on 7 March 1951.

Eight forest brothers and an unknown number of KGB guards took part in the battle. The battle was also the first major clash between the Forest Brothers and MGB forces in the Vastseliina region. MGB soldiers came to capture the bunker from two sides: from the village of Mauri towards Saika and from the village of Rebäse towards Saika.

Around 10am, gunshots and machine-gun fire began to be heard from the forest in the nearby villages. 

The battle lasted for about four hours and a total of six Forest Brothers were killed. Five MGB soldiers were killed in the engagement. 

Only two out of the eight Forest Brothers survived the battle, August Kuus and Richard Vähi. They were able to survive for the following two years until 1953, where they both died in a battle in Puutli.

A memorial stone was opened in 2007 to memorialize the six Forest Brothers that died in the engagement.

Battle of Puutli 
The largest bunker battle of Puutli in Vastseliina municipality took place on 29 March 1953, in Vastseliina Parish, Võru County. In 1953, the partisans hid in a bunker in the forest near the villages of Loosi and Puutli. The Resistance had eight forces.

On 29 March, the KGB officers raided the Forest Brothers' bunker at 9am. The bunker siege lasted almost three hours. There was a powerful exchange of fire in the forest.

Forest brothers Richard Vähi, Karl Kaur, August Kuus, August Kurra, Leida Grünthal, Endel Leimann, Lehte-Kai Ojamäe and Ilse Vähi were killed in the battle. The wounded Forest Brothers exploded their grenades to prevent them from falling into the hands of the enemy.

However, the losses of the KGB forces were much greater. After the battle, the bunker was burned by security. The fallen Forest Brothers were taken for identification and later buried at the edge of the Ristimäe forest.

Aftermath 
A list of Forest Brothers who have died since 1944 compiled by Eerik-Niiles Kross contains 1,700 names, including Forest Brothers who have died in captivity. Historian Mart Laar claims, based on Kross, that there were more than 2,200 known fatalities.

The last partisan, August Sabbe, died in a clash on 27 September 1978, reportedly drowning in a river after being found by KGB while he was fishing, where he was lodged under a log.

Since 1998, the Defense League has been organizing military-sports expeditions in the forests of Vana-Vigala and Eidapere every summer, which is called the Põrgupõhja expedition. The trip is dedicated to the memory of the freedom fighters.

In 2019, a job was created in the Estonian War Museum to study the Forest Brothers.

In popular culture 
The Canadian film Legendi loojad (Creators of the Legend) about the Estonian Forest Brothers was released in 1963. The film was funded by donations from Estonians in exile.
A 1997 documentary film We Lived for Estonia tells the story of the Estonian Forest Brothers from the viewpoint of one of the participants.
The 2007 Estonian film Sons of One Forest (Estonian: Ühe metsa pojad) follows the story of two Forest Brothers in southern Estonia, who fight with an Estonian from the Waffen-SS against the Soviet occupants.
The 2013 novel Forest Brothers by Geraint Roberts follows the fortune of a disgraced British Navy officer who returns to Estonia in 1944 for British Intelligence. Many of the people from his past who aid him have taken to the forest, during the ongoing conflict between Germany and the Soviet Union.

Estimates 
According to historians who studied the forest holdouts, there were about 14,000–15,000 Forest Brothers in Estonia after the Second World War, along with people simply hiding in the woods, the total number of Forest Brothers has been suggested to be higher, up to 30,000. According to a report submitted by Soviet KGB Major Oskar Borelli in June 1953, 1,495 members of the Forest Brothers and secret organizations had been killed by the Soviet KGB forces between 1944 and 1 June 1953, and 9,870 people had been arrested (5,471 members of the Forest Brothers and 1,114 members of the secret organization, 1212 citizens).

According to Soviet sources, 891 people died between 1946 and 1956 as a result of the Forest Brotherhood, including 447 Soviet and party activists, newcomers and their families, 295 members of extermination battalions, 52 NKVD and NKGB, MGB and 47 military personnel.

See also
 Anti-Soviet partisans
 Guerrilla war in the Baltic states
 Latvian partisans
 Lithuanian partisans
 Omakaitse

References

Paramilitary organizations based in Estonia
Estonian Soviet Socialist Republic